Torawari(طوراوڑی) is a village with a small population. Torawari was a part of Federally Admisinstred Tribal Areas (F.A.T.A). But recently in 2019 bill was passed under the government of Prime Minister Imran Khan and he approved it. Now its Torawari, Khyber PakhtunKhwa, Pakistan. Torawari which is located in the Tehsil Thal Hangu District in Khyber Pakhtunkhwa, Pakistan.

Torawari is bordered by Kuram agency to the north, Naryab to the east, Darsamand to the west, and Doaba to the south.

Tribes
The main tribe living in Torawari is Khuidad khel.
Khado khel, Hassan khel, Bharat Khel, Bharam khel and Tappy are the sub tribes of khuidadkhail tribe.Awan tribe also found in Tora Wari.

References

Union councils of Hangu District
Populated places in Hangu District, Pakistan